USCGC Salvia (WLB-400) was a United States Coast Guard  in commission from 1944 to 1991. She operated in the Great Lakes and along the United States Gulf Coast during her career. Sold and renamed Brian Davis in 2020 for use as a memorial vessel, she was scuttled as an artificial reef in 2020.

Construction and commissioning
Salvia was constructed by the Zenith Dredge Corporation at Duluth, Minnesota. Launched on 19 September 1943, she was commissioned on 19 February 1944.

Design
The Iris-class buoy tenders were constructed after the Mesquite-class buoy tenders. She was powered by one electric motor. This was connected up to two Westinghouse generators which were driven by two CooperBessemer GND-8 four-cycle diesel engines. She had a single screw.

The ships had a complement of six officers and seventy-four crew members in 1945; this decreased to two warrants, four officers, and forty-seven men in 1966. They were fitted with a SL1 radar system and QBE-3A sonar system in 1945. Their armament consisted of one 3"/50 caliber gun, two 20 mm/80 guns, two Mousetraps, two depth charge tracks, and four Y-guns in 1945; these were removed in 1966.

Career 

After commissioning, Salvia was assigned to aid-to-navigation (ATON) and icebreaking duties in the Great Lakes. In May 1944, she was assigned to the 5th Coast Guard District and stationed in Portsmouth, Virginia, where she remained until the end of World War II in 1945.

After the war, Salvia was homeported in Mobile, Alabama, and continued to perform general ATON duties. In April 1951 she was disabled in Calasieu Pass near Cameron, Louisiana, and was towed back to port by the cutter . In December 1968, Salvia searched for survivors from the lost coastal buoy tender . She was decommissioned on 4 October 1991.

Disposal 

By mid-May 2019, Salvia was lying at Virginia Beach, Virginia, in scrap condition, with her engines and most equipment removed, and the General Services Administration had put her up for auction.

In 2020, Salvia was sold for use as a memorial vessel and artificial reef.

See also
 List of United States Coast Guard cutters

References

External links

 

Historic American Engineering Record in Alabama
Iris-class seagoing buoy tenders
1944 ships
Ships built in Duluth, Minnesota
Maritime incidents in 2020
Shipwrecks of the Carolina coast
Ships sunk as artificial reefs